Emil Simonsen better known by his stage name Orgi-E (born in 1979 in Denmark) is a Danish rapper who in 1997 became part of the formation Suspekt alongside  Rune Rask and Bai-D (Andreas Bai Duelund). He has also developed his solo career independent of the group. In 2005, he cooperated with Troo.L.S, a previous member of Suspekt in the album Forklædt som voksen. In 2012 his solo album Klamfyr released on Tabu Records reached #1 on the Danish Albums Chart in its first week of release.

Discography

Albums

Collaborations

Suspekt albums

Singles

References

Danish rappers
1979 births
Living people